Iran Cassius (born 3 January 1985) is an international football player from Saint Lucia, who plays as a goalkeeper.

Career
He made his international debut for Saint Lucia in 2010 and has appeared in FIFA World Cup qualifying matches.

References

Living people
1985 births
Saint Lucian footballers
Saint Lucia international footballers
Humble Lions F.C. players
Association football goalkeepers